Fertig is a German word meaning "ready" or "finished".

As a surname, it may refer to:
 Craig Fertig (1942–2008), Oregon State University football coach
 George Fertig (1915–1983), Canadian artist
 Jack Fertig (1955–2012), astrologer and drag queen
 Kevin Fertig (born 1977), wrestler
 Lawrence Fertig (1898–1986), advertising executive and libertarian journalist and economic commentator
 Wendell Fertig (1900–1975), American civil engineer and Philippine guerrilla leader

See also
 Achtung, fertig, Charlie!, a 2003 German film
 Fertigation, application of nutrients to crops via irrigation

Surnames of German origin